The Basic School (TBS) is where all newly commissioned and appointed (for warrant officers) United States Marine Corps officers are taught the basics of being an "Officer of Marines." The Basic School is located in Stafford County, Virginia to the south-west of the Marine Corps Base Quantico complex. Each year, over 1,700 new officers are trained, representing such commissioning sources as the U.S. Naval Academy, Navy ROTC (Marine Option), Officer Candidates School, and Marine Corps Limited Duty Officer (LDO) and Warrant Officer accession programs.

Philosophy of instruction at TBS

The School's "Five Horizontal Themes" define the expectations of every student officer at TBS. These themes are:

A Leader of Exemplary Character
Has a clear understanding that a Marine commission brings with "special trust and confidence" and the highest expectations of the American people.
Devoted to the Core Values of Honor, Courage and Commitment
Possesses a moral compass that unerringly points to "do the right thing" – an ethical warrior

Devoted to Leading Marines and Sailors  24/7
Embraces the "exceptional and unremitting" responsibility to one's Marines and their families
Inspire and instill confidence in his/her Marines during times of adversity
Adheres to and enforces standards regardless of time of day, location or duty status
Treats all Marines and Sailors with dignity and respect
Dedicated to a lifetime of study and learning about the profession of arms

Able to Decide, Communicate, and Act in the fog of war
Can think critically and arrive at an acceptable decision based on sound tactical thinking within their commander's intent
Communicates clearly both orally and in writing in tactical and administrative situations with emphasis on issuing clear, meaningful orders and guidance
Have a bias for action – seizes the initiative and acts instead of waiting for the perfect sight picture or direction from higher
Once action is initiated, acts with boldness and determination
A Warfighter Who Embraces Our Naval Character and the Corps' warrior ethos 
A competent combat leader, grounded in the basic infantry skills, and characterized by sound judgment and aggressiveness in execution
Educated in the fundamentals of maneuver warfare, tactics, combined arms, and the time-tested principles of battle
Maintains an offensive mindset throughout – proactive, not reactive
Mentally Strong and Physically Tough
Imbued with a warrior spirit and able to thrive in a complex and chaotic environment and persevere despite the obstacles to mission accomplishment
Possesses the self-discipline to push past preconceived limits

Courses conducted at TBS

Basic Officer Course (BOC)

Introduction and background
After earning a commission, new Marine Second Lieutenants (Unrestricted Line Officer Marine Lieutenants) complete the Officer Basic Course prior to beginning their job specialization (Military Occupational Specialty, or MOS) training to prepare them for service in the Marine Corps at large (Fleet Marine Force or other operating forces assignments). The majority of Marine Corps officers are commissioned through the USMC Officer Candidate School (OCS), but many are also graduates of the U.S. Naval Academy, or other service academies who choose to commission with the Marine Corps instead. Restricted Line/Limited Duty Officers are direct commissioned from the chief warrant officer ranks as either a first lieutenant or captain and do not attend BOC; however, as warrant officers, they have already completed the WOBC at TBS prior to beginning their officer service in the operating forces.

Most officers attend BOC as a second lieutenant immediately after commissioning at OCS or within a few months of graduation and commissioning from either the USNA or an NROTC program. Some newly commissioned officers may serve a short period of time in an interim assignment (such as an assistant athletic coach at the USNA) before beginning TBS/BOC. A few officers attend BOC as a first lieutenant because they were commissioned through the Platoon Leaders Class (PLC Law) program, which permits them to attend law school as second lieutenants and then attend TBS/BOC after promotion to first lieutenant upon receiving their law degree. In very rare cases, an officer who receives an initial commission in another branch of the US armed forces, and who has already been promoted to first lieutenant, may receive an interservice transfer to the Marine Corps and attend TBS as a first lieutenant.

Course overview
The Officer Basic Course currently lasts 28 weeks, during which new officers receive classroom, field, and practical application training on weapons, tactics, leadership and protocol. The course is split into three graded categories:, Leadership, Academics, and Military Skills.  Much like OCS, graded events are split between events that are graded and events that must be passed. Events that must be passed are the 15-mile hike, all three exams, the Endurance Course, Final Land Navigation, Night Land Navigation, and Rifle and Pistol Qualification. Events that simply are n a grade are the 3, 6, 9, and 12 mile hikes, leadership billets in field exercises, and various decision-making exercises.

Classroom events include topic specific lectures, exams, tactical decision games (TDGs), sand table exercises (STEXs), decision-forcing cases, and small group discussions. There are various field events, beginning with fireteam and squad level, and progressing to platoon-reinforced and company-sized events.  The field events consist of realistic blank-fire training and live fire ranges.

Phases of instruction
Phase I (7 Weeks): Individual Skills
Leadership
Rifle and Pistol Qualification
Land Navigation
Communications
Combat Lifesaving
MCMAP
Phase II (6 Weeks): Rifle Squad Leader Skills
Decision-making
Combined Arms
Rifle Squad Tactics/Weapons
Scouting and Patrolling
Phase III (6 Weeks):  Rifle Platoon Commander Skills
Rifle Platoon Tactics
Convoy Operations
Engineering
Crew-served weapons
Phase IV (7 Weeks): Basic MAGTF Officer Skills
Military Operations on Urbanized Terrain, or MOUT
Rifle Platoon (REIN) Tactics
Force Protection
Expeditionary Operations (AMFEX/"War")
Legal/Platoon Cmdr's Admin

MOS selection and post BOC training and assignments
Throughout the Program of Instruction (POI), Marines in each training company are split into thirds according to their combined scores of Leadership, Military Skills, and Academics. Each Marine ranks each specialization, or MOS, according to their preference, and each third is allocated an equal proportion of each specialization according to the Marine Corps' needs. Each third is independent of the others, so the top of the bottom third of placement is nearly as likely to get the specialization that they want as the top of the other two thirds. Throughout the POI, each Marine will have the opportunity to select which specialization they prefer in a mock-draft like setting, selecting what they prefer from what is leftover according to their grade placement in their third. Using these mock-drafts and listed preferences as reference, company staff then goes through each student and bestows upon them a specialization. This lottery system, however, does not apply to those Marines who signed air contracts to become pilots or law contracts to become legal officers.

Following the Basic Officer Course, the officer will attend one or more additional schools to be trained in their specialty, and then assigned to a unit in the Fleet Marine Force or other operating forces of the Marine Corps (e.g., Marine Barracks, Washington, DC, Marine Corps Chemical Biological Incident Response Force, Marine Corps Security Force Regiment, or the Marine Corps Embassy Security Group.

Warrant Officer Basic Course (WOBC)
Marine warrant officers attend a 16-week training regime similar in scope and instruction to the 28-week course required of second lieutenants, which is shortened due to the prior experience possessed by the newly appointed warrant officers. They are assigned to India Company at Camp Barrett.

An enlisted Marine can apply for the warrant officer program after serving at least eight years of enlisted service, and reaching the grade of E-5 (Sergeant) for the administrative warrant officer program. For the Marine Warrant Officer (Gunner) program, a Marine must have at least sixteen years of enlisted service in an infantry MOS. This requirement is waived for those holding the rank of Gunnery Sergeant for a minimum of one year prior to applying for the weapons warrant officer program. Sergeants or Staff NCOs who are selected are given additional leadership and management training during the Warrant Officer Basic Course.

Infantry Officer Course (IOC)
Graduates of the BOC who are selected for an infantry MOS remain at TBS for the fifteen-week Infantry Officer Course. This course was just extended from twelve weeks to better develop the infantry officers. During this program lieutenants receive intensive classroom instruction, practical experience, and field training in crew-served weapons, patrolling, and reconnaissance to ensure that they are MOS qualified for all of the infantry platoon commander billets, in addition to the rifle platoon, within a Marine infantry battalion. The other infantry billets are: rifle company weapons platoon (i.e., crew-served weapons) commander, as well as commander of one of the three heavy-weapons platoons (viz., 81mm mortar, antiarmor, and heavy machine gun) of the infantry battalion weapons company. Infantry officers may seek to compete for a tour as a reconnaissance platoon commander after serving an initial tour with an infantry unit.

Officers selected to serve in a Light Armored Reconnaissance (LAR) battalion complete an additional six-week LAR leaders course conducted at the USMC School of Infantry.

"Mike" Company 
Marines who first arrive from OCS or the USNA, or who are unable to complete the BOC, WOBC, or IOC for either failing one of the three graded categories or are significantly injured are sent to M Company, or "Mike Company." Marines in Mike Company provide support operations for companies that are actively training, as well as attend classes and physical events, until they can be given a new USMC MOS if they come from IOC, or resume training if they have yet to complete WOBC or BOC. Mike Company also has Marines who graduated from BOC but are awaiting MOS school pickup.

See also
 United States Marine Corps Boot Camp
 Marine Corps Recruit Depot Parris Island
 Marine Corps Recruit Depot San Diego

References

Citations

General sources

Web
 
 Official Descriptions MOS's
 "The Basic School", The Making of a Marine Officer, MarineTimes.com.
 Quantico: Marine Combat Development Command – The Basic School

External link

Basic
Military in Virginia
Quantico, Virginia